Krzysztof Michalak (born 15 April 1987) is a Polish midfielder who plays for Omega Kleszczów.

Club career
Michalak made his debut in the Polish II Liga with GKS Bełchatów as an 82nd-minute substitute against Szczakowianka Jaworzno on 8 June 2005.

References

External links
 

1982 births
Sportspeople from Bełchatów
Living people
Association football midfielders
Polish footballers
GKS Bełchatów players
Polonia Bytom players
RKS Radomsko players
Ekstraklasa players
I liga players
II liga players